The Reckoning is a best-selling novel by John Grisham. In addition to Grisham's typical legal thriller, the book was also characterized by reviewers as "a murder mystery, a courtroom drama, a family saga, a coming-of-age story," "a period piece", and a war novel.

Plot
The plot centers on the 1946 murder trial of prominent family patriarch Pete Banning, a war hero who has returned home from the Second World War.

The story takes place in the fictional town of Clanton, Mississippi, in Grisham's Ford County. It is the seventh Grisham novel to take place here, following A Time to Kill, The Summons, The Chamber, The Last Juror, Sycamore Row, and A Time for Mercy.

Pete Banning comes from a family that has farmed cotton for generations. He is owner of a 640-acre parcel in northern Mississippi. In Part One, "The Killing," Pete's wife Liza has recently been placed in a mental institution; his children Joel and Stella are college students; and his sister Florry is a would-be writer who lives on an adjacent parcel. One morning, Pete rises and decides that today is the day for an act of killing. He goes about his normal activities before heading into town, where he walks in on Dexter Bell, the pastor of the local Methodist church, and draws a gun. The pastor exclaims, "If it's about Liza, I can explain." Pete shoots Bell three times, killing him.

Pete makes no secret of what he has done and the town is aghast. Sheriff Nix Gridley drives out to the Banning farm, arrests Pete and jails him without resistance. To all inquiries about his actions, Pete replies, "I have nothing to say." His children are instructed to stay away from Clanton. The pastor's widow, Jackie Bell, takes her three children to her hometown in Georgia.

After some internal friction, a grand jury returns an indictment of first degree murder. Banning family attorney John Wilbanks attempts to construct a defense but Pete refuses to allow a request for change of venue or preparation for a plea of temporary insanity. Joel and Stella attempt to visit their mother at the State Hospital, but are denied access per instructions from Pete. Pete's trial is brief. The DA makes a straightforward case that is not refuted in any way by Wilbanks, at Banning's insistence. The jury returns a verdict of guilty with a sentence of death by electrocution. Pete is allowed to visit Liza at the State Hospital, where she says, "Can you forgive me?" He says he cannot but that he continues to love her. On the day of Banning's scheduled execution, the governor of Mississippi meets privately with Banning and offers to commute the sentence to life imprisonment if Banning will state a reason for having committed the murder. He again replies that he has nothing to say. The execution is carried out in the Clanton courthouse and Banning is buried the next day.

Part Two, "The Boneyard," an extended flashback, begins in 1925 with Pete as a new West Point graduate who meets 18-year-old Liza at a debutante ball in Memphis. After a brief and passionate romance, they elope and marry. After the deaths of Pete's parents in the early 1930s, Pete leaves the active military, enters the reserves and the couple moves to the cotton farm. After a few difficult years, the farm returns to profitability. Pete is recalled to active military duty in 1939. He ends up in the Philippines, where U.S. forces surrender to the Japanese in April 1942. On the death march to a prisoner of war camp, Pete is knocked unconscious, falls into a ditch and is presumed dead by fellow prisoners. However, he survives, rejoins the march and is imprisoned under brutal conditions. Two months later, word reaches the farm that he is missing and presumed dead. Later in 1942, as Pete is being transferred by ship to a slave labor camp in Japan, he escapes when the ship is torpedoed. A letter to Liza providing his status is ripped up by sympathetic Filipinos who are afraid of reprisal if found in possession of the letter.

Pete and fellow U.S. soldier Clay Wampler join a guerilla force in the Philippine mountains and mount numerous effective attacks on Japanese personnel, vehicles and planes. In late 1944, U.S. forces begin the liberation of the Philippines. Pete is rescued in early 1945 and returns to the U.S. for treatment in a San Francisco military hospital. Liza receives a call from him and, after recovering from her shock, she rushes to San Francisco for a joyous reunion. In May 1945, he returns to Mississippi.

In Part Three, "The Betrayal," the story line of Part One is resumed. Joel becomes the legally appointed guardian of his mother. He and Stella begin visiting her periodically. Errol McLeish, a Georgia lawyer who has befriended Jackie Bell, associates Mississippi lawyer Burch Dunlap as counsel to represent her in a wrongful death suit against the Banning estate. As a lengthy sequence of legal issues is worked out, Joel and Stella make fitful progress on bringing stability back into their lives, with Joel in law school at Mississippi and Stella working as a teacher with an eye on New York. Liza escapes from the State Hospital, returns home, has a long talk with Florry, goes to the cemetery and commits suicide lying atop Pete's grave. The Jackie Bell lawsuits prevail despite appeals and other delaying tactics, resulting in all of the Pete Banning property going to Bell, who has married McLeish.

Climatic Ending - Spoiler Alert
Florry is living with a friend in New Orleans and in failing health. Joel and Stella go for a final visit. On her deathbed, Florry tells the story of how Liza, thinking Pete was dead in the Philippines, had an impromptu sexual relationship with Jupe, grandson of two elderly employees on the Banning family farm who were descended from slaves. Liza became pregnant and was taken to Memphis by Dexter Bell for an abortion. She was left with a persistent infection that caused her to lose interest in resuming the hitherto vigorous sexual relationship with Pete upon his return from the war. Pete ultimately confronted her with evidence of the abortion and suspected she had an affair with Dexter. Liza, unable to admit to a sexual relationship with a young black man, let Pete believe that Dexter was the father. Stunned, Joel says "So I guess Pete killed the wrong man, right, Florry?" and walks out.

After mulling over the mess, Joel understands why all the people did what they did, but wishes he were still ignorant. When Stella joins him, they agree that the two of them will stick together and never return to Clanton.

"What a family," he says, as Stella weeps.

References

Novels by John Grisham
2018 American novels
Doubleday (publisher) books
Novels set in Mississippi
Hodder & Stoughton books